is a Japanese manga artist who publishes works primarily for Kodansha. He made his debut with Superfly in Kodansha's Monthly Shōnen Magazine. He is best known for his manga Drifting Net Cafe, The Flowers of Evil and Happiness. His works have been adapted into many different media including television drama, anime, and live action film. In 2001, he won the Tetsuya Chiba Award.

Background
Oshimi's hometown is in the countryside of Kiryu, Gunma, which also served as the setting of his manga The Flowers of Evil. While growing up there, the main places he would visit were the riverbank, the stairs of his junior high school, and the bookstore. Oshimi currently resides in Tokyo.

Career
Oshimi debuted with Superfly in Kodansha's Monthly Shōnen Magazine. He would go on to start his first series Avant-Garde Yumeko in the magazine. His works have been adapted into many different media, with Drifting Net Café and Inside Mari into television dramas, The Flowers of Evil into an anime, and Sweet Poolside into a live action film. In 2001, he won the Tetsuya Chiba Award.

Influences
In his childhood Oshimi would read modernist poems from authors like Sakutarō Hagiwara and Mitsuharu Kaneko. Oshimi also thought that surrealist artists like André Breton, Max Ernst, and Paul Delvaux were cool. His favorite artist is Redon. and he also likes Francisco Goya. In his youth, Oshimi heavily identified with the protagonist of Tetsu Adachi's Song of Cherry Blossoms and it would later influence his manga The Flowers of Evil.

Themes
Oshimi's narrative style consists of stories presenting quirky, clumsy main characters, usually a boy and a girl couple, and how their relationship unfolds as the narrative progresses. He also presents uncommon, uncomfortable and, sometimes, disturbing situations through which the protagonists take part. This narrative style has been seen in all of the author's works, including his best-known work, The Flowers of Evil.

Oshimi likes to explore themes such as coming-of-age and perversion, combined with his experiences in his youth. He thinks that the end of adolescence is hard to define, and is up to an individual to discover, such as in The Flowers of Evil. He also believes that perversion is a characteristic of every person that is surrounded by stigma which he wants people to think about. Oshimi also wants to explore the female perspective in his gender-bender manga Inside Mari, because to him, girls are "half of the world".

Works
 – Independent work, first published in the "Avant-Garde Yumeko" collection.

 – Published by Kodansha, single-volume.
 – Published by Kodansha, single-volume.
 – Published by Kodansha, 4 volumes.
 – Published by Kodansha, 2 volumes.
 – Published by Futabasha, 7 volumes.
 – Published by Kodansha, 11 volumes.
 – Published by Ohta Publishing, single-volume.
 – Serialised in Manga Action, published by Futabasha, 9 volumes.
 – Published by Kodansha.
 2017) – Serialised in Feel Young, published by Shodensha, single-volume.
, 2017) – Published by Futabasha. It is an art book featuring art from many of Shūzō Oshimi's works.
 – Serialised in Web Comic Action, published by Futabasha, single-volume.
 2021) – Serialised and published by Weekly Young Magazine, single-volume.
  – Serialised in Big Comic Superior, published by Shogakukan.
 2020–) – Serialised in Bessatsu Shōnen Magazine, published by Kodansha.

References

External links 
 

 
1981 births
Living people
Manga artists from Gunma Prefecture
Japanese illustrators
People from Kiryū, Gunma